Uroš Slokar (born May 14, 1983) is a Slovenian former professional basketball player who last played for Pallacanestro Cantù of the Lega Basket Serie A.

Professional career
After playing two seasons in the Slovenian basketball league, Slokar moved to Italy's Serie A in 2003, where he represented Benetton Treviso and Pallalcesto Amatori Udine. Upon his 2005 NBA Draft selection by the Toronto Raptors (58th overall), he remained a further season in Europe. In his 2006-2007 NBA season the Raptors won a first ever Atlantic Division title.

On August 16, 2007, Slokar signed a one-year deal with Triumph Lyubertsy, formerly known as Dynamo Moscow Region, which plays in the Russian Super League and the European Eurocup. After one season in Russia, he returned to Italy and signed with Fortitudo Bologna for the next two years.

For the 2009–10 season he returned to Slovenia, where he played for Union Olimpija. He later left the club for Montepaschi Siena.

In October 2010 he signed with the Spanish League club Assignia Manresa.

In August 2011, he signed with Lottomatica Roma. One year later, in July 2012, he came back to Spain to play with CB Gran Canaria. On October 31, 2013, he signed a six-week contract with Alba Berlin.

On December 16, 2013, he signed a two-month deal with CB Estudiantes. On February 18, 2014, he was re-signed for the rest of the season. On October 29, 2014, he again re-signed with Estudiantes.

On August 28, 2015, he signed with Baloncesto Sevilla, ending his contract with the Andalusian club January 19, 2016.

On February 28, 2016, Slokar signed with Serie A team Juvecaserta Basket for the rest of the season.

On December 29, 2016, Slokar signed with Pallacanestro Cantù for the remainder of the season.

National team career

Internationally, Slokar has played with Slovenia at the 1999 FIBA Europe Under-16 Championship, the 2000 FIBA Europe Under-18 Championship, the 2002 FIBA Europe Under-20 Championship, the 2005 FIBA European Championship, the 2007 FIBA European Championship, the 2009 FIBA European Championship, the 2011 FIBA European Championship, the 2013 FIBA European Championship, the 2015 FIBA European Championship, the FIBA World Olympic Qualifying Tournament for Men 2008, the 2006 FIBA World Championship, the 2010 FIBA World Championship and the 2014 FIBA World Championship.

Career statistics

NBA

Regular season

|-
| style="text-align:left;"|
| style="text-align:left;"|Toronto
| 20 || 0 || 3.6 || .538 || .500 || .692 || .7 || .1 || .1 || .1 || 1.9
|- class="sortbottom"
| style="text-align:center;" colspan="2"|Career
| 20 || 0 || 3.6 || .538 || .500 || .692 || .7 || .1 || .1 || .1 || 1.9

Awards and achievements
 Slovenian League Rookie of the Year (2002) 
 Slovenian SuperCup Championship (2009)
 2× Italian champion (2006, 2010)
 3× Italian Cup winner (2004, 2005, 2010)
 German Cup champion (2013)
 German Supercup champion (2013)

References

External links

Official Website
NBA.com Profile
ACB.com Profile

Euroleague.net Profile

1983 births
Living people
ABA League players
Alba Berlin players
Bàsquet Manresa players
BC Zenit Saint Petersburg players
CB Estudiantes players
CB Gran Canaria players
Centers (basketball)
Fortitudo Pallacanestro Bologna players
Juvecaserta Basket players
KD Slovan players
KK Olimpija players
Liga ACB players
Mens Sana Basket players
National Basketball Association players from Slovenia
Pallacanestro Treviso players
Pallacanestro Virtus Roma players
Pallalcesto Amatori Udine players
Power forwards (basketball)
Real Betis Baloncesto players
SAM Basket players
Slovenian expatriate basketball people in Canada
Slovenian expatriate sportspeople in Russia
Slovenian expatriate basketball people in Italy
Slovenian expatriate basketball people in Spain
Slovenian expatriate basketball people in the United States
Slovenian expatriate sportspeople in Germany
Slovenian expatriate sportspeople in Switzerland
Slovenian men's basketball players
Basketball players from Ljubljana
Toronto Raptors draft picks
Toronto Raptors players
2006 FIBA World Championship players
2010 FIBA World Championship players
2014 FIBA Basketball World Cup players